Development of the Commercial Crew Program began in the second round of the Commercial Crew Development (CCDev) program, which was rescoped from a technology development program for human spaceflight to a competitive development program that would produce the spacecraft to be used in the Commercial Crew Program to provide crew transportation services to and from the International Space Station (ISS). To implement the program NASA awarded a series of competitive fixed-price contracts to private vendors starting in 2011. Operational contracts to fly astronauts were awarded in September 2014 to SpaceX and Boeing.  Each company performed an uncrewed orbital test flight in 2019, and operational flights started in November 2020.

SpaceX's Crew Dragon Demo-1 2019 flight of Dragon 2 arrived at the International Space Station in March 2019 and returned via splashdown in the Atlantic Ocean. After completion of its test series, a Crew Dragon spacecraft made its first operational Commercial Crew Program flight, SpaceX Crew-1. The flight launched on 16 November 2020. SpaceX has since completed four more successful CCP flights, with another, SpaceX Crew-6, currently in progress. It is contracted with NASA for fourteen operational flights total to the ISS.

The 2019 Boeing Orbital Flight Test of the CST-100 Starliner spacecraft failed to reach the ISS in December 2019. The second test flight, Boeing Orbital Flight Test 2, occurred successfully in May 2022. Pending completion of its demonstration flights, Boeing is contracted to supply six operational flights to the ISS. The first group of astronauts was announced on 3 August 2018.

Requirements
Key high-level requirements for the Commercial Crew vehicles include:
Safely deliver and return four crew members and their equipment to the International Space Station (ISS)
Provide assured crew return in the event of an emergency
Serve as a 24-hour safe haven in the event of an emergency
Capable of remaining docked to the station for 210 days

Background

After the retirement of STS in 2011, NASA had no domestic vehicles capable of launching astronauts to space. Artemis, NASA's next major human spaceflight initiative, was scheduled to launch an uncrewed qualification flight in 2016, with an Orion spacecraft atop a Space Launch System (SLS) booster. The NASA had no human-qualified spacecraft available, and in any event SLS/Orion would be too expensive for routine flights to the ISS. In the meantime, NASA continued to send astronauts to the ISS on Soyuz spacecraft seats purchased from Russia. The price varied over time, with the batch of seats from 2016 to 2017 costing $70.7 million per passenger per flight. Artemis continued to slip, with the first uncrewed test flight scheduled for 2022.

Development Program
The CCDev program was initiated to develop safe and reliable commercial ISS crew launch capabilities to replace the Soyuz flights. CCDev followed Commercial Orbital Transportation Services (COTS), an ISS commercial cargo program. CCDev contracts were issued for fixed-price, pay-for-performance milestones. CCDev was implemented in several phases. CCDev 1 contracts were for development of concepts and technologies. CCDev 2 contracts were for actual vehicle designs. CCiCap contracts were for designs of complete end-to-end crew transportation hardware and services. CPC phase 1 contracts were for the development of a full certification plan. Finally CCtCap contracts were awarded for actual demonstration of crewed transportation services, which included development, testing, and production of the required hardware followed by operatinal flights to the ISS.

CCDev 1

Commercial Crew Development  (CCDev 1) consisted of $50 million awarded in 2010 to five US companies to develop human spaceflight concepts and technologies. NASA awarded development funds to five companies under CCDev 1:
 Blue Origin: $3.7M for a 'pusher' Launch Abort System (LAS) and composite pressure vessels.
 Boeing: $18M for development of the CST-100 Starliner
 Paragon Space Development Corporation: $1.4M for a plug-and-play environmental control and life support system (ECLSS) Air Revitalization System (ARS) Engineering Development Unit.
 Sierra Nevada Corporation: $20M for development of the Dream Chaser
 United Launch Alliance: $6.7M for an Emergency Detection System (EDS) for human-rating Atlas V

CCDev 2

On 18 April 2011, NASA awarded nearly $270 million to four companies for developing U.S. vehicles that could fly astronauts after the Space Shuttle fleet's retirement. Funded proposals:

 Blue Origin: $22 million. Technologies in support of a biconic nose cone design orbital vehicle, including launch abort system liquid oxygen/liquid hydrogen engines.
 Sierra Nevada Corporation: $80 million. Dream Chaser
 SpaceX: $75 million. Dragon 2 integrated launch abort system
 Boeing: $92.3 million. Additional CST-100 Starliner development

Proposals selected without NASA funding:
 United Launch Alliance: extend development work on human-rating the Atlas V
 Alliant Techsystems (ATK) and Astrium proposed development of Liberty. NASA will share expertise and technology.
 Excalibur Almaz Inc. was developing a crewed system with modernized Soviet-era hardware intended for tourism flights to orbit. An unfunded Space Act Agreement to establish a framework to further develop EAI's spacecraft concept for low Earth orbit crew transportation.

Proposals not selected:
 Orbital Sciences proposed the Prometheus lifting-body spaceplane vehicle
 Paragon Space Development Corporation proposed additional development of the Commercial Crew Transport-Air Revitalization System.
t/Space proposed a reusable eight-person crew or cargo transfer spacecraft
United Space Alliance proposed to commercially fly the two remaining Space Shuttle vehicles.

CCiCap

Commercial Crew integrated Capability (CCiCap) was originally called CCDev 3. For this phase of the program, NASA wanted proposals to be complete, end-to-end concepts of operation, including spacecraft, launch vehicles, launch services, ground and mission operations, and recovery. In September 2011, NASA released a draft request for proposals (RFP). The final RFP was released on February 7, 2012, with proposals due on March 23, 2012. The funded Space Act Agreements were awarded on August 3, 2012, and amended on August 15, 2013.

The selected proposals were announced 3 August 2012:
 Sierra Nevada Corporation: $212.5 million. Dream Chaser/Atlas V
 SpaceX: $440 million. Dragon 2/Falcon 9
 Boeing: $460 million. CST-100 Starliner/Atlas V

CPC phase 1
The first phase of the Certification Products Contract (CPC) involved the development of a certification plan with engineering standards, tests, and analyses. Winners of funding of phase 1 of the CPC, announced on December 10, 2012, were:
 Sierra Nevada Corporation: $10 million
 SpaceX: $9.6 million
 Boeing: $9.9 million

CCtCap – crew flights awarded
The Commercial Crew Transportation Capability (CCtCap) is the second phase of the CPC and included the final development, testing and verifications to allow crewed demonstration flights to the ISS. NASA issued the draft CCtCap contract's Request For Proposals (RFP) on 19 July 2013 with a response date of 15 August 2013. On 16 September 2014, NASA announced that Boeing and SpaceX had received contracts to provide crewed launch services to the ISS. Boeing could receive up to US$4.2 billion, while SpaceX could receive up to US$2.6 billion. In November 2019 NASA published a first cost per seat estimate: US$55 million for SpaceX's Dragon and US$90 million for Boeing's Starliner. Boeing was also granted an additional $287.2 million above the fixed price contract. Seats on Soyuz had an average cost of US$80 million. However, adjusting for the additional cargo carried by Boeing's Starliner inside its crew capsule, the adjusted cost per seat figure is approximately $70 million, which is still higher than SpaceX's Crew Dragon even if the Dragon does not carry the equivalent of a fifth passenger in cargo. Both the CST-100 Starliner and Crew Dragon were to fly an uncrewed flight, then a crewed certification flight, then up to six operational flights to the ISS.

Timeline

Ongoing delays
The first flight of the Commercial Crew Program was planned to occur in 2015, but insufficient funding caused delays. As the spacecraft entered the testing and production phase, technical issues have also caused delays, especially the parachute system, propulsion, and the launch abort system of both capsules.

Starliner 2018 valve issue
In July 2018, a test anomaly was reported in which there was a hypergolic propellant leak due to several faulty abort system valves. Consequentially, the first unpiloted orbital mission was delayed to April 2019, and the first crew launch rescheduled to August 2019. In March 2019, Reuters reported these test flights had been delayed by at least three months, and in April 2019 Boeing announced that the unpiloted orbital mission was scheduled for August 2019.

Crew Dragon explosion

On 20 April 2019, an issue arose during a static fire test of Crew Dragon. The accident destroyed the capsule which was planned to be used for the In-Flight Abort Test (IFAT). SpaceX confirmed that the capsule exploded. NASA stated that the explosion would delay the planned in-flight abort and crewed orbital tests.

Starliner Orbital Flight Test failure

During the first orbital flight test of Starliner in December 2019, the spacecraft reached orbit but was unable to dock with ISS due to a critical software error. Subsequent analysis revealed a second critical software error that could cause the service module to collide with the capsule after separation during the de-orbiting sequence.

Crew Dragon crewed flight

On May 30, 2020 two astronauts were launched to the ISS with a Crew Dragon as part of Crew Dragon Demo-2.  The end and safe landing of Demo-2 on August 2, 2020 marked the first splashdown in 45 years for NASA astronauts since the first Apollo–Soyuz U.S./U.S.S.R international space mission in July 1975, as well as the first splashdown of a crew spacecraft in the Gulf of Mexico.

Starliner 2021 valve issue

Shortly before the scheduled launch of the second orbital flight test in August 2021, routine pre-launch testing showed that thirteen valves in the propulsion system were inoperable and the launch was scrubbed. the problem required extensive analysis that was still ongoing in October 2021, and NASA and Boeing estimated that a new launch date would be scheduled in the first half of 2022.

Starliner Orbital Flight Test 2

Boeing Starliner Spacecraft 2 launched as part of the Boeing Orbital Flight Test 2, on May 19, 2022. It successfully docked on May 21, where it stayed for four days. On May 25, the spacecraft undocked and landed successfully in the White Sands Missile Range.

Funding 

The first flight of the Commercial Crew Program was planned to occur in 2015, but insufficient funding caused delays. For the fiscal year (FY) 2011 budget, US$500 million was requested for the CCDev program, but Congress granted only $270 million. For the FY 2012 budget, $850 million was requested and $406 million approved. For the FY 2013 budget, 830 million was requested and $488 million approved. For the FY 2014 budget, $821 million was requested and $696 million approved. In FY 2015, $848 million was requested and $805 million, or 95%, was approved. On November 14, 2019, NASA's inspector general published an auditing report listing per-seat prices of $90 million for Starliner and $55 million for Dragon Crew. With these, Boeing's price is higher than what NASA has paid the Russian space corporation, Roscosmos, for Soyuz spacecraft seats to fly US and partner-nation astronauts to the space station. The report also states that NASA agreed to pay an additional $287.2 million above Boeing's fixed prices to mitigate a perceived 18-month gap in ISS flights anticipated in 2019 and to ensure the contractor continued as a second commercial crew provider, without offering similar opportunities to SpaceX. On November 18, 2019, Boeing's Jim Chilton replied that the inspector general's report failed to list Starliner’s positive features and objected to the per seat pricing as they believe the cost is lower than $90 million given its cargo capacity. Boeing's reasoning for the extra funding was due to a later start to its development than SpaceX with comparable deadlines. Boeing also stated it committed to the program. The funding of all commercial crew contractors for each phase of the CCP program is as follows—CCtCap values are maxima and include six post-development operational flights for each vendor.

Test Missions 
Each system is required to complete three specific uncrewed test flights and one crewed flight test before NASA will consider the system human-rated. Crew Dragon completed its crewed flight test in 2020 and began operational flights in November 2020.  Starliner has not yet completed its crewed flight test.

Operational missions

See also

 Commercial Orbital Transportation Services
 Commercial Resupply Services
 NASA Docking System
 Private spaceflight
 Review of United States Human Space Flight Plans Committee
 Space Shuttle successors

References

External links
 Official NASA Commercial Crew Program page
 Official NASA Press Kit relating to the Commercial Crew Program
 Commercial Crew & Cargo Document Library on NASA.gov
 CCDev 1 Space Act agreements
 Partners Mature Spacecraft Designs, NASA video update, 14 January 2014.
 Boeing CCtCap Contract (redacted)
 SpaceX CCtCap Contract (redacted)

Human spaceflight programs
Space Act Agreement companies
NASA programs
Private spaceflight
International Space Station